Charles Nesbitt may refer to:

Charles H. Nesbitt, former Minority Leader of the New York State Assembly
Charles R. Nesbitt, former Attorney General of Oklahoma